Bjørn Inge Utvik (born 28 February 1996) is a Norwegian footballer who plays as a defender for Sarpsborg 08 in Tippeligaen. He has previously played for Haugesund and Sogndal.

Career
Utvik was born in Avaldsnes and he started his career with FK Haugesund.

Utvik joined Sogndal in 2013. He made his debut for Sogndal in a 3-1 defeat against Strømsgodset.

Career statistics

References 

1996 births
Living people
People from Karmøy
Norwegian footballers
Norway under-21 international footballers
Norway youth international footballers
Sogndal Fotball players
FK Haugesund players
Sarpsborg 08 FF players
Eliteserien players
Norwegian First Division players
Association football defenders
Sportspeople from Rogaland